Nine ships of the Royal Navy have been named HMS Linnet after the linnet, a bird of the finch family:

  was a 14-gun brig, originally named Speedwell, which the French ship Gloire captured off Madeira in 1813. She became the American privateer Bunkers Hill. Pomone and  recaptured her on 4 March 1814 but she was not taken back into Royal Navy service.
  was a 16-gun brig that operated on the Canadian Lakes.
  was a survey cutter  launched in 1817 and sold in 1833 for breaking up.
  was an 8-gun brig launched in 1835 and sold in 1866.
  was a  steam powered gunboat launched in 1860 and broken up in 1872.
  was a composite screw gunvessel launched in 1880.  After she was sold in 1904, the ship was converted to a salvage vessel.
 HMS Linnet was a tender originally named Napier of Magdala. She was renamed Hasty in 1913 and sold in 1920.
  was a  destroyer, originally planned as HMS Havock. She was launched in 1913 and sold in 1921.
  was a  launched in 1938 and broken up in 1964.

See also
 Linnet (disambiguation)

References

Royal Navy ship names